Unfinished Spaces is a 2011 documentary film about the revolutionary design of the National Art Schools (Cuba), directed by Alysa Nahmias and Benjamin Murray. The film tells the dramatic story of the art schools from their founding by Fidel Castro and Che Guevara to their eventual abandonment and fall into ruin and recent efforts to restore them.

The three visionary architects Ricardo Porro, Roberto Gottardi, and Vittorio Garatti are interviewed on camera. They talk about the intense atmosphere of revolutionary Cuba and how they strove to create an entirely new language of architecture, one without precedent. They also speak about why their design fell into disfavor and how the complex was mostly abandoned, uncompleted.

As the film shows, parts of the schools are in ruins while other parts are used today by young dancers and artists. These schools are on the watch list of the World Monuments Fund, and efforts to restore the abandoned buildings are being explored.

Unfinished Spaces was produced by Alysa Nahmias and Benjamin Murray, filmmakers who became obsessed with the story of the schools' rise and downfall. The film received several important grants and had its World Premiere at the Los Angeles Film Festival in June 2011. The film was favorably reviewed in The Hollywood Reporter and LA Weekly. It went on to have its Cuban premiere at Havana's 2011 Festival Internacional de Nuevo Cine Latinoamericano and win an award at the Miami International Film Festival in 2012. It was broadcast on PBS in the United States, HBO Latin America, and the "Witness" series on Al-Jazeera English.

The film was the recipient of the 2014 Society of Architectural Historians Film and Video Award and winner of a 2012 Film Independent Spirit Award. Unfinished Spaces also won the 2014 Society of Architecture Historians Award for Film and Video

Unfinished Spaces is in the permanent collection of the Museum of Modern Art in New York City.

References

External links 
 Unfinished Spaces website
 

Documentary films about education

Documentary films about architecture
Architecture in Cuba
Documentary films about Cuba
American documentary films
2011 documentary films
American independent films
2011 directorial debut films
2011 independent films
2010s English-language films
2010s American films